Polyscias scutellaria, the shield aralia,  or plum aralia, is a tropical shrub or small tree reaching 2–6 meters in height. A native of the Southwest Pacific islands, it is commonly grown in gardens.

The leaves and root can be used as an antiseptic and deodorant.

Applications in cuisine
Ancient native Indonesians have used shield aralia leaf as a bowl substitute due to its bowl-like shape and tear-resistant properties. In modern Indonesian cuisine shield aralia can be used as fancy food packaging. Shredded shield aralia has aromatic properties that can be mixed with meat or fish to conceal the odor.

References

External links

scutellaria
Plants described in 1768
Taxa named by Nicolaas Laurens Burman